A2 Ethniki Water Polo is the 2nd-tier of the Greek Water Polo championship. It is held in three groups of teams and in current season, 14 teams take part. The championship is held in two stages. The two first teams of the 2nd stage promoted to A1 Ethniki. Current champions AEK won the 2019-20 A2 men's water polo season.

Winners

Title holders  

 1986–87 Iraklis
 1987–88 NOP 
 1988–89 NOX
 1989–90 NOP
 1990–91 OFTH
 1991–92 NAO Kerkyras
 1992–93 Aris 
 1993–94 OFTH
 1994–95 Panionios 
 1995–96 Poseidon Ilision
 1996–97 Ilysiakos
 1997–98 Panathinaikos
 1998–99 Aris 
 1999–00 PAOK 
 2000–01 Nhreas Chalandriou 
 2001–02 Panionios 
 2002–03 NO Chalkidas 
 2003–04 Glyfada
 2004–05 Nhreas Chalandriou
 2005–06 Iraklis
 2006–07 NEP 
 2007–08 Iraklis 
 2008–09 Poseidon Ilision 
 2009–10 Ethnikos
 2010–11 NOX
 2011–12 Ilioupoli
 2012–13 Glyfada
 2013–14 NO Kalamakiou 
 2014–15 NEP 
 2015–16 NOP
 2016–17 Apollon Smyrnis
 2017–18 Peristeri
 2018–19 Panathinaikos
 2019–20 AEK

Titles

Titles by club 

Notes
  Classification of first 12 champion teams by the number of titles and year of achievement.

Current teams
The clubs taking part in the 2015–16 league are:

References

External links
www.koe.org.gr

Water polo competitions in Greece